The Bi-Cultural Hebrew Academy of Connecticut is an independent Jewish K-12 school located in Stamford, Connecticut.

The Jewish High School of Connecticut (JHSC) in Stamford, in the fall of 2018, merged with the Bi-Cultural Day School to become the Upper School for the Bi-Cultural Hebrew Academy of Connecticut.

History

In 2007, the Board of Trustees established the Jewish High School of Connecticut. JHSC opened its doors in the 2010–2011 academic year. The founding Head of School was Rabbi Edward Harwitz. The final Head of School prior to the merger was Rabbi Elisha Paul.

The school originally was located in Bridgeport, Connecticut at Congregation B'nai Israel. It subsequently moved to Woodbridge before moving again to the Cytec Building in Stamford, Connecticut. After merging with Bi-Cultural Day School, the school remained at its site in Stamford before moving onto the Bi-Cultural Hebrew Academy campus in the fall of 2019.

Athletics
JHSC was an affiliate of the Connecticut Constitutional Conference and competed with other high schools in the region. After the merger, the school became a probationary member of the FairChester Athletic Association.

At various times, JHSC offered the following sports: soccer, basketball, track and field, tennis, golf, swimming, and weights and conditioning.

References

External links 

 Upper school

Private K-12 schools in the United States
Private elementary schools in Connecticut
Private middle schools in Connecticut
Private high schools in Connecticut
Pluralistic Jewish day schools
Jewish schools in the United States
2010 establishments in Connecticut
Stamford, Connecticut